Rosie Flores (born Rosalie Flores; September 10, 1950) is an American singer, songwriter and musician. She currently resides in Austin, Texas, where August 31 was declared Rosie Flores Day by the Austin City Council in 2006.

Biography
Rosie Flores was born in San Antonio, Texas, United States, where she lived until the age of twelve, when her family moved to San Diego. In interviews, Flores has recalled that growing up, she loved to watch musical television shows like The Dick Clark Show and Hit Parade. She began singing as a young child, and her brother, Roger, taught her to play rhythm guitar when she was a teenager.

Flores formed her first band, Penelope's Children, while still in high school in California. In the 1970s, Flores played the San Diego nightclub circuit and was the namesake of the alt country/cowpunk band Rosie and the Screamers. After leaving the Screamers, she joined a cowpunk all-female band called Screamin' Sirens in the 1980s. The latter band produced a series of 7-inch singles and tracks for compilation albums before releasing an album in 1987, Voodoo.

Flores's self-titled solo debut came out on Warner Bros./Reprise in 1987. The single, "Crying Over You", put her on the Billboard chart for the first time. Since then, Flores has recorded ten additional solo albums.

Flores has toured widely, appearing in the United States, Europe, Asia, and Australia, and also performing frequently in Austin, continuing into 2019. In 1995, she joined Wanda Jackson on a coast-to-coast North American tour, and she toured as a member of Asleep at the Wheel in 1997. She has also traveled with a concert tribute she created to honor Janis Martin, a program which she performed at the Rock and Roll Hall of Fame and Museum among other places. In 2012, she was part of the Rock and Roll Hall of Fame's tribute to Chuck Berry. Her media appearances include Austin City Limits and Late Night with Conan O'Brien, and she had a cameo role in the 1993 film The Thing Called Love.

In addition to her work as a performer and songwriter, Flores has helped to revive the careers of female rockabilly musicians from previous generations and to create new interest in their music. Her album Rockabilly Filly, released on Hightone Records in 1995, included vocals from early rock and roll musicians Janis Martin and Wanda Jackson. In 2007, Flores brought Janis Martin to a recording studio in Blanco, Texas, to record what would be both Martin's first solo album in thirty years as well as her last before her death of cancer. After the project was turned down by a number of record labels, Flores raised more than $16,000 on Kickstarter to release the album, which was titled Janis Martin: The Blanco Sessions. Flores is credited as a producer.

Flores's current (as of 2013–2018) guitar of choice is her James Trussart SteeltopCaster.  She uses Fender amplifiers, and has also played Fender Telecasters, Gretsch electrics, Gibson Les Pauls, and various acoustic guitars.

Musical style

According to AllMusic, Flores's "talent for alternative country and rockabilly made her a favorite with both audiences and critics." Nashville Scene defined Flores as a "New Wave country-rocker". San Diego Tribune described Flores as a "dynamo of rockabilly and cow-punk" who is "equally gifted as a singer, songwriter, guitarist and band leader [and] shines whether performing country, rock, swing or any of the other earthy American styles she has made her own."

Personal life
Flores has revealed that, under pressure from her manager, she had an abortion in 1986, shortly after signing with Warner Bros. She later regretted the decision. She has never been married, and has said that her lifestyle, which involves frequent touring, makes it difficult to maintain long-term relationships.

Discography

Awards and nominations

References

External links

 
 
 Rosie Flores at the Rockabilly Hall of Fame
 L.A. Record: Rosie Flores interview
 Rosie Fores in the Austin Chronicle

American alternative country singers
American country guitarists
American country rock singers
American women country singers
American country singer-songwriters
American rockabilly guitarists
1950 births
Cowpunk musicians
Musicians from San Antonio
Writers from Austin, Texas
Musicians from Austin, Texas
American musicians of Mexican descent
Living people
Asleep at the Wheel members
Reprise Records artists
Bloodshot Records artists
Singer-songwriters from Texas
Guitarists from Texas
Women new wave singers
20th-century American women guitarists
20th-century American guitarists
21st-century American women guitarists
21st-century American guitarists
Country musicians from Texas
20th-century American women singers
21st-century American women singers
Hispanic and Latino American musicians
20th-century American singers
21st-century American singers